Belle Prairie City is an incorporated town in Hamilton County, Illinois, United States. The population was 49 at the 2020 census. It is part of the Mount Vernon Micropolitan Statistical Area.

Geography

Demographics

As of the census of 2000, there were 60 people, 24 households, and 19 families residing in the town. The racial makeup of the town was 100.00% White.

There were 24 households, out of which 41.7% had children under the age of 18 living with them, 66.7% were married couples living together, 4.2% had a female householder with no husband present, and 20.8% were non-families. 20.8% of all households were made up of individuals, and 16.7% had someone living alone who was 65 years of age or older. The average household size was 2.50 and the average family size was 2.89.

In the town, the population was spread out, with 25.0% under the age of 18, 6.7% from 18 to 24, 25.0% from 25 to 44, 28.3% from 45 to 64, and 15.0% who were 65 years of age or older. The median age was 38 years. For every 100 females, there were 106.9 males. For every 100 females age 18 and over, there were 114.3 males.

The median income for a household in the town was $37,031, and the median income for a family was $37,344. Males had a median income of $35,000 versus $22,083 for females. The per capita income for the town was $19,528. None of the population and none of the families were below the poverty line.

References

External links
Hamilton County Historical Society

1869 establishments in Illinois
Mount Vernon, Illinois micropolitan area
Populated places established in 1869
Towns in Hamilton County, Illinois
Towns in Illinois